Las Toscas is a village or populated centre in the Tacuarembó Department of northern-central Uruguay.

Geography
The stream Arroyo Caraguatá flows by the west limits of the village.

Population
In 2011 Las Toscas had a population of 1,142.
 
Source: Instituto Nacional de Estadística de Uruguay

Places of worship
 Parish Church of the Holy Sacrament and St. Thérèse of Lisieux (Roman Catholic)

References

External links
INE map of Las Toscas

Populated places in the Tacuarembó Department